Route 5 (Chinese: 五號幹綫) is a strategic route in Hong Kong from eastern to western Kowloon and New Kowloon, and ends in Tsuen Wan in the New Territories where it connects to Route 9. It is one of the most seriously congested routes in Kowloon, as it serves as an interchange to the Hung Hom Cross-Harbour Tunnel, especially during peak hours.

Route 5 begins in the east from Kowloon Bay westwards via central Kowloon to Yau Ma Tei. From Yau Ma Tei, the road heads north to Tsuen Wan and meets Route 9. In the Tai Kok Tsui section of Route 5, where the route runs in south-north direction, the northbound and southbound lanes are separated, with the northbound and southbound flyovers running over two parallel roads (Tai Kok Tsui Road and Tong Mi Road respectively). It passes through Ngau Tau Kok, Kowloon Bay, Ma Tau Chung, Hung Hom, Yau Ma Tei, Lai Chi Kok, Kwai Chung and Tsuen Wan.

Constituent roads
The following roads comprise route 5 (from east to west):
 
 Kai Tak Tunnel
 East Kowloon Corridor
 Chatham Road North
 Chatham Road South
 Gascoigne Road Flyover
 West Kowloon Corridor
 
 
  (West Kowloon Corridor West)
 
 Lai Chi Kok Road
 Kwai Chung Road
 Lai Chi Kok Bridge
 Tsuen Wan Road

There are plans  to ease congestion within Kowloon to outlying areas in the New Territories and alternate to Route 7.

Observed roads and exits

See also
Route 6 (Hong Kong)

References
 Route 5 Highway, Hong Kong

 
Routes in Hong Kong